The Middle East is a large region that consists of different countries. Majority of the people in these countries participate in a Patriarchy systems of religions such as Islam, Christianity, or Judaism, which all prohibit premarital sex. Premarital sex is when a couple practices sexual activity before getting married. While dating and premarital sex are looked down upon because of religious and social reasons, it is not illegal. In addition, young people rarely learn about sexual health in school, and other sources of information may not be reliable. In more recent times, attitudes about premarital sex and relationships have shifted to a more accepting light for men. However, cultural and social norms that mostly favor males make it difficult for some women to openly talk about sexual health. Between the controversy of social normality's and religious laws, it is safe to assume that any sex without intentions of procreations through marriage would be considered taboo.

Afghanistan 
In Afghanistan according to Islam law a man could have four wives, so long as he can treat them equally and satisfy them accordingly. Many first wives are emotionally and sexually neglected by the second marriage, and completely abandoned by the third and fourth. Although emotional and sexual deprivation is considered a justifiable causation for a woman to request for a divorce. Although justifiable it is uncommon because it is defined as taboo and considered disgraceful. Most women who do file, do so under violence or domestic abuse.

Sexual and Reproductive Health Education
Sexual health education varies from country to country. Sexual education usually includes learning about puberty, sexually transmitted infections and diseases, and preventing unwanted pregnancies. Most people can agree that sex education is important for young adults to learn about because that is when they are most sexually active. Generally, young people in the Middle East will get their information about sexuality and reproduction from their parents. However, young people are afraid to ask out of fear that their parents will assume they are engaging in sexual activities. Nevertheless, young adults will engage in sexual activities regardless of being informed about the dangers of unprotected sex.
Media in the Middle East does not offer much when it comes to sexual and reproductive health. In addition, political figures do not advocate for more accurate information when it comes to sexual health. If political figures introduced sexual health more into public schools and the media, then perhaps talking about sex would not be so taboo. although there has been evidence on the importance of sexual education for women and girls, publicly it is still frown upon. Safe spaces are being created in refugee camps in order to help the mere conversation on the subject of sex less taboo.

Egypt 
The formal education system in Egypt provides young people with very limited information on sex and reproductive health. A survey conducted in 2009 by the Population Council in Cairo showed that 15,000 people aged 10–29 received little to no information on sexual health from public school. In addition to receiving minimal sexual education, outside information on sexual education was not helpful nor reliable. According to the same survey, young girls who started their periods reacted in fear, shock, or tears. This is due to the lack of knowledge about puberty from schools or other sources.

Media Literacy 
The available information in the media reveals that children and teenagers are often considered to be separate from the larger community. In such patriarchal societies gender bias is common and women are mostly at a disadvantage because they are voiceless even when it concerns matters of their bodies. Consequentially, there is a wide gap that remains unattended when it comes to fund allocation for education, health, social services and the media that offers a voice to the marginalized women. It is paramount to look at sexual and reproductive education challenges using a single service delivery system as opposed to the current disposition of no vision at all. Among the numerous problems dogging media literacy in Middle East are reproductive health and sexual health issues. The twist in the tale is that premarital sex is largely prohibited while media coverage of such issues as sexual and reproductive health is considered taboo. This indicates a society characterized by self-denial and hypocrisy because people know and even think that sexual reproduction health is crucial but nobody wants to confront it

Attitudes Toward Premarital Sex
Dating in the Middle East is growing more and more popular amongst younger people in order to get to know the person before marriage. While it is becoming more socially acceptable to date people, premarital sex is still stigmatized for some. Various factors play a part in the attitudes toward premarital sex in the Middle East such as gender, religion, age, and general political attitudes, etc. This is largely due to the fact that religious texts such as the Bible or Qur’an deem extramarital sex to be immoral and punishable by God. Fornication is called Zina in the Qur’an which is an offense against God.

Iran 
Majority of both men and women in Iran supported dating in order to get more acquainted with the person before marriage. On the other hand, when it came to intimacy and non-sexual contact, 69% of men were open to it compared to only 50.5% of women. There were certain things that would affect a person's attitudes towards premarital sex. Education levels made no significant difference in whether someone agreed with premarital sex. Religion however, played a big part in the attitudes towards premarital sex. Those who were religious were more against premarital sex than those who were not religious. In addition, older people tended to be more against premarital sex than younger people.

Turkey 
Premarital sex is growing more acceptable for men in Turkey, but is still widely disapproved of for women. A study done in Turkey including 124 undergraduate students and 60 adults showed some of the various views on premarital sex. Women who have engaged in premarital sex are looked at as being less desirable than women who are virgins. This is because female virginity is valuable in deciding whether a woman is pure in Turkish culture. Men tended to look more negatively upon premarital sex compared to women, yet men engaged more in premarital sex than women did.

Political and Public Goodwill
There is a wide agreement among activists and intellectuals on the non-existence of professional development on crucial fields such as health care and media. It is therefore commonplace to find these professionals lacking the knowhow in terms of strategies or tactics that could be used to reach out to the young people especially women who need to learn more about their sexual health and reproduction. Another cause of disconnect is that many professionals are afraid of speaking taboo topics not to upset the system. Additionally, there is also the lack of sufficient health professionals as well as lack of interest among the professionals to employee the limits resources to gain or develop modern tactics.

Disconnect between policy, research, and practice is detrimental to sexual and health reproduction in Middle East. Usually, the official policies in Middle East do less than combat the underlying sexual taboo. Additionally, the policy makers focus on the issue adopting diagnostic approaches instead of providing prescriptive approaches that could help solve the problem once and for all. Sadly, the media in Middle East has also adopted the behaviour from the political class where they are reluctant to break taboos.

Islam and Homosexuality 
Although not a definitive indication of societal behavior, as will be made clear in the following sections, under Islamic law homosexual acts are unequivocally prohibited. The Koran refers to homosexuals as Lot's people (quam Lut), Lot being the prophet who preached against homosexuality in the cities of Sodom and Gomorra. According to Kligerman, “In the Qur’an, Lut questions, ‘How can you lust for males, of all creatures in the world, and leave those whom God has created for you as your mates? You are really going beyond all limits’... The Prophet Muhammad adds, "Doomed by God is who does what Lot’s people did" (i.e. to engage in same-sex sexual activity) .’”

Muhammad adds that, “’No man should look at the private parts of another man, and no woman should look at the private parts of another woman, and no two men sleep [in bed] under one cover, and no two women sleep under one cover.’ In his last speech, known as the ‘Farewell Sermon’, the Prophet added a last condemnation of homosexuality, saying, ‘Whoever has intercourse with a woman and penetrates her rectum, or with a man, or with a boy, will appear on the Last Day stinking worse than a corpse; people will find him unbearable until he enters hell fire, and God will cancel all his good deeds.’”

Homosexual Behavior
As stated prior, the religious prescriptions of Islam are not a definitive indication of one’s behavior in society. Although one may be hesitant to proclaim themselves openly as homosexual, it is not uncommon for one to participate in homosexual activities so long as they simultaneously uphold other societal norms. One essential institution in the Middle East is the family. So long as a man upholds this institution, by taking a wife and fathering children, what occurs in private will be of no interest to others. “Known homosexuals were tolerated in public office if they continue to publicly live a heterosexual lifestyle. For instance, Sultan Mehmet II, Ottoman conqueror of Constantinople, and Sultan Mahmud Ghaznawi, who invaded India from Afghanistan, are both important historical figures and known gays. Both men had several wives and children. While Westerners would view these men—and those like them—as bisexual, Muslims view them as consistent with shari’a; they maintained an outwardly conforming appearance in terms of familial and public life but happened to engage in homosexual activity.” Homosexual acts can also be well received if they allude to an expression of dominance over another, “’In Turkey, Egypt and the Maghreb, men who are ‘active’ in sexual relations with other men are not considered homosexual; the sexual domination of other men even confers a status of hyper-masculinity.’”

A distinction seems to be made between the active partner and the receiving one, the pathic. In the former category one is viewed positively because they either retain their masculinity through the active role or use it as a means toward the degradation of the pathic. A great anecdote to the latter manifestation can be seen in this story,

“Toward the end of the year 1701, a Druze chieftain (Emir) from the Wādī alTaym area in Syria came to Damascus to be officially invested as head military official (Yāyābāshī) of his home region by the governor of the city. According to a contemporary chronicler, the Emir was a notorious womanizer, who ‘in Damascus was determined to conduct himself with his characteristic lewdness.’ Once, while at the house of a local woman, he was surprised by around twenty Turcoman soldiers, who gang-raped him and robbed him of his clothes, leaving him barefoot and clad only in his inner garments. ‘He who encroaches upon the womenfolk (h.arı¯m) of the Muslims deserves more than this,’ they reportedly said before letting him go. ‘News of the incident,’ the chronicler added, ‘reached the women and children [of the city], and songs about him [i.e., the Emir] were composed and performed by singers . . . He then departed to the land of the Druzes, his home, and it was said that the woman remained untainted [i.e., she was not dishonored before the arrival of the soldiers], and thus God forsook the damned Emir at the hands of the Turcomans.’” The people viewed Turcomans treatment of the Emir as an honorable one. There focus was not on whether or not such acts constituted anything that could be identified as “homosexual” in nature, but rather the effects that such actions would have on the Emir. The Emir, by being both the receiver (the pathic) of the sex act and by doing so against his will (as a result of his attempt to defile, so to speak, the local woman) is stripped of his dignity which has subsequently been transferred to his conquerors. “[T]o penetrate phallically is to dominate, subjugate, and ultimately to humiliate”

Pederasty in Pre-modern Middle East (1500-1800 CE)

According to literature that can be dated as far back as the 1500s to present day is where we can find evidence of, pederasty, or amorous and sexual relations between men and adolescent boys. To an unknown extent this has been prevalent over various periods of time . Pederasty is easily confused with pedophilia; the latter is characterized by a sexual attraction to children who have not yet begun pubertal development. Some too draw a distinction between what might be called a biological definition of childhood and a socio-legal one. The former characterizing childhood in terms of the biological distinctions present in that stage in relation to other stages of development (infancy, adolescence, adulthood, etc.) and the latter characterizing the child in terms of both the prescribed sociological and legal distinctions.

Pederasty is a phenomenon that can be found historically in places such as Ancient Greece, Ancient Rome ,  China, and Japan. Such inclinations and behaviors are found in the Middle East as well . During the pre-modern period (1500-1800 CE) there was a widespread conviction that beardless youths were a temptation to adult men as a whole, and not merely to a small minority of deviant.

“Traditions warning against the temptation posed by beardless youths were numerous, some of them attributed to prominent religious figures of the early Islamic period, others to the Prophet Muhammad himself. One tradition related that the Prophet prohibited men from gazing at beardless boys, and another that Muhammad himself had seated a handsome young member of a visiting delegation from the tribe of Qays behind him so as to avoid looking at him.”

Such an attraction, or behavior, was not equal in all regions of the Middle East, nor did it survive through all pre-modern time periods. Still, though its presence is salient.

"Mālikī scholars of the early Ottoman period repeatedly confirmed that a man would negate his state of ritual purity if he touched with lust the skin of a beardless or downy-cheeked youth, since they fell under the category of that 'which is normally the object of lust.'"

Some Westerners noted pederastic tendencies of in the Middle East. The Englishman Joseph Pitts, a sailor who was captured and sold into slavery at Algiers in 1678 noted:

"This horrible sin of Sodomy is so far from being punish’d amongst them, that it is part of their ordinary Discourse to boast of their detestable Actions of that kind. ’Tis common for Men there [Algiers] to fall in Love with Boys, as ’tis here in England to be in Love with Women".

The French traveller Charles-Nicolas-Sigisbert Sonnini de Manoncourt, who visited Egypt between 1777 and 1780, made a similar observation:

"The passion contrary to nature . . . the inconceivable appetite which dishonored the Greeks and Persians of antiquity, constitute the delight, or, to use a juster term, the infamy of the Egyptians. It is not for the women that their amorous ditties are composed: it is not on them that tender caresses are lavished; far different objects inflame them.” 

While of perhaps only of anecdotal interest, the reactions of Muslims visiting Europe lend further credence to the claim of this distinct cultural difference. [T]he Moroccan scholar Muhammad al Saffār, who visited Paris in 1845– 46, wrote:

"Flirtation, romance, and courtship for them take place only with women, for they are not inclined to boys or young men. Rather, that is extremely disgraceful to them".

The Egyptian scholar Rifāah al Tahtāwī, who was in Paris between 1826 and 1831, noted:

"Amongst the laudable traits of their character, similar really to those of the Bedouin [arab], is their not being inclined toward loving male youths and eulogizing them in poetry, for this is something unmentionable for them and contrary to their nature and morals. One of the positive aspects of their language and poetry is that it does not permit the saying of love poetry of someone of the same sex. Thus, in the French language a man cannot say: I loved a youth (ghulām), for that would be an unacceptable and awkward wording. Therefore if one of them translates one of our books he avoids this by saying in the translation: I loved a young female (ghulāmah) or a person (dhātan).”

At the end of his book Before Homosexuality in the Arab-Islamic World, 1500-1800, Khaled El-Rouayheb concludes,

“Falling in love with a teenage youth and expressing this love in verse were not punishable offenses, and a significant number of Islamic scholars, though not all, asserted that such behavior was not objectionable.”

While not indicative of the Middle East as a whole, these anecdotal accounts provide at least some bases for the existence of such preferences in the pre-modern Middle East. The vast majority of men in the Middle East, even in ancient times, married women and fathered children without sexually engaging young boys. Others, possibly a large minority, practised pederasty.

Western Moral Influence
Today, for some, the Middle East is known as one of the most repressive regions with regards to sexual expression. Some historians have noted, however, that with respect to homosexuality, such repression was, imported, so to speak, from the West. [T]he encounter with European Victorian morality was to have profound effects on local attitudes toward what came to be called “sexual inversion” or “sexual perversion” (shudhūdh jinsā). With the Middle East's contact with the West came an increasing importance placed on assimilation, so to speak, with the values and systems prescribed from the West. The rise in participation in international markets came the destruction of the kinship-based community and an increasing stigma toward homosexuality ”‘The concept of homosexuality as defining a particular type person and a category of ‘deviance’ came to the Middle East [through the agency] of the West’ as well. Until Western influence, homosexuality did not carry a negative connotation in the Muslim world. The change in community structure and the rising influence of Western perceptions thus largely created the contemporary taboo against homosexuality in Muslim societies.”

Before this influence from the West there was no identity or concept of “homosexuality”, though in practice acts that could be considered homosexual in nature did occur, but it simply was not conceptualized as it is now. With the increased influence of the West, even if one were to abide by the societal norms that once made such behavior inconsequential, such homosexual behavior is now met with increased opposition.

See also

References 

Middle Eastern culture
Sexuality in Islam